Tripod fish is a common name for different species of fish:

Ipnopidae, a family found worldwide in deep seas, including:
Bathypterois grallator, the most famous species in the family
Triacanthidae, a family from the Indo-Pacific